A Holy Thorn may refer to:

One of the thorns from the Crown of Thorns
Holy Thorn Reliquary, a reliquary created to hold one of the Holy Thorns
The Glastonbury Thorn

Christian folklore